Jake Daniels (born 8 January 2005) is an English professional footballer who plays as a forward for EFL Championship club Blackpool.

Career
A youth product of Blackpool since the age of seven, Daniels began playing with their U18s in 2021 and was named Blackpool's youth team player of the season for 2020–21, scoring 30 goals for the U18s. He signed his first professional contract with the club on 25 February 2022, and joined Northern Premier League side Bamber Bridge on loan on 26 March for the remainder of the 2021–22 season. He made his debut for the Blackpool senior side in a 5–0 EFL Championship loss to Peterborough United on 7 May, coming on as an 81st-minute substitute.

Personal life
In May 2022, Daniels came out as gay, becoming the UK's only male professional footballer to be publicly out at the time, and the first since Justin Fashanu in 1990. He cited fellow footballer Josh Cavallo, Thetford Town manager Matt Morton, and diver Tom Daley as helping him come out. His decision to come out was praised by British Prime Minister Boris Johnson, FA president Prince William and England captain Harry Kane. On 29 June, he was shortlisted in the Celebrity of the Year category for the 2022 National Diversity Awards for the "courageous decision" he made the previous month.

References

External links
 

2005 births
Living people
People from Bispham, Blackpool
English footballers
Blackpool F.C. players
Bamber Bridge F.C. players
English Football League players
Northern Premier League players
Association football forwards
British LGBT footballers
English LGBT sportspeople
Gay sportsmen